Nicholas Salamis (August 13, 1897 – October 15, 2005) was a Greek Orthodox priest of the Eastern Orthodox faith who witnessed almost a century of Greek emigration into Canada.

Early life
Salamis was born on the Greek island of Samos. When he was five, his father died, leaving the family destitute. His mother raised her two sons and one daughter on money earned by renting out a mule for conveyance to local villagers.

Salamis' mother was determined to educate her sons. She enrolled both her boys in the high school on the other side of the island where Nicholas received his training in commerce. Seventeen years old and armed with his certificate, Nicholas first immigrated to America (see Greek American), then settled in the Greek community of Montréal in 1919.

The Greek community in Montréal, following World War I, had a population of 2,000 Greeks, and 500 Greek-owned businesses. It was not long before Salamis was the bookkeeper for the whole community. Despite this supportive community and the prospect of continued success, Salamis felt something lacking in his life.

Study
At 35, Salamis returned to Athens to study theology. He had decided to become an Orthodox priest. In 1938, he became Father Nicholas Salamis and spent the first seven years of his priesthood at St. George Greek Orthodox Church parish in Toronto. In 1945 he was transferred back to Montréal.

Return to Canada
The Eastern Orthodox Church is vital to any Greek community—it serves as a link to the past and the glue that binds the various factions of a Greek community often divided by political beliefs and opinions. Salamis arrived in Montréal just before a great change took place in the Greek community. Towards the end of the 1940s, over 100,000 Greeks immigrated to Canada. They were largely uneducated, unskilled, with little or no knowledge of either official language of Canada.

They fled to Canada to escape the horrors that had plagued Greece for the better part of the century: war, oppression, and economic collapse. Salamis not only administered to their spiritual needs with baptisms, weddings, and funerals, he also eased the frictions which developed between the established Greek community and the new immigrants, who were referred to as "displaced persons" (see Greek Diaspora).

Pastoral work
By his own count, Salamis performed over 10,000 religious ceremonies during his service to the Greek Orthodox community of Canada.

Salamis became the rock of the community over the next forty years, watching over his flock from the time they arrived as desperate new immigrants, scared and clinging to the safety of their community. He shepherded the children of these immigrants as they became members of the greater Canadian society, learning the official languages, getting the education that their parents so desperately wished for them.

Salamis died at the age of 108 on October 15, 2005.

Dates of Ordination:
Deaconate: September 25, 1938
Priesthood: September 26, 1938
 
Communities Served:
June 1961 – 1990: St. George Greek Orthodox Church, Montréal, Québec
April 1945 – May 1961: Holy Trinity Greek Orthodox Church, Montréal, Québec
October 1938 – March 1945: St. George Greek Orthodox Church, Toronto, Ontario

See also
A Scattering of Seeds

References

Greek emigrants to Canada
Members of the Church of Greece
Canadian centenarians
Men centenarians
1897 births
2005 deaths
Eastern Orthodox Christians from Greece
Eastern Orthodox Christians from Canada